Prano Bailey-Bond is a Welsh film director and writer. Her debut feature film, Censor, premiered in 2021.

Career
Bailey-Bond studied at London College of Printing. She began directing with music videos and short films.

Her writing and directorial feature film debut, a psychological horror film named Censor, had its world premiere at the 2021 Sundance Film Festival.

Filmography

Shorts
Short Lease (2010) - co-directed by Bailey-Bond and Jennifer Eiss
Man vs Sand (2012) – directed by Bailey-Bond
The Trip (2013) – directed by Bailey-Bond
Nasty (2015) – written and directed by Bailey-Bond
Shortcut (2016) - directed by Bailey-Bond

Feature films
Censor (2021) – written and directed by Bailey-Bond

Awards
2011: Best Pop Video – Budget, 2011 UK Music Video Awards for Cool Fun's "House"
2011: Dirty Looks award for Best Music Short, London Short Film Festival for Cool Fun's "House"

References

External links

Welsh film directors
Welsh women film directors
Welsh screenwriters
Living people
Place of birth missing (living people)
Year of birth missing (living people)